Pediomeryx is an extinct genus of artiodactyl, of the family Palaeomerycidae, endemic to North America. Fossils have been recovered from the Midway Site in Florida, Saskatchewan, Boron, California, and several sites in Nebraska and Wyoming. They were comparable in size to red deer, most specimens weighing between 100 and 200 kg, but surpassing 400 kg on the case of P. figginsi.

References 

Palaeomerycidae
Zanclean extinctions
Miocene even-toed ungulates
Miocene mammals of North America
Prehistoric cervoids
Prehistoric even-toed ungulate genera
Tortonian first appearances
Fossil taxa described in 1936